Castil may refer to:

Castil de Peones, municipality located in the province of Burgos, Castile and León, Spain
Castil de Vela, municipality located in the province of Palencia, Castile and León, Spain
Castil-Blaze, known as Castil-Blaze (1784–1857), French musicologist, music critic, composer, and music editor